The following lists events that happened during 1975 in the Republic of Afghanistan.

Incumbents
 President: Mohammed Daoud Khan

Events
Domestically, many of the economic difficulties of the previous year continue in areas remote from the capital, with the result that the gap in living standards between Kabul and the more distant provinces widening. Under the energetic guidance of Mohammed Daoud Khan, considerable external help was secured for the construction of oil refineries, fertilizer factories, and various agricultural projects envisaged in the then current five-year plan, both China and the Soviet Union having contributed interest-free loans and technical aid. There were no serious challenges to the president's authority, supported by a regular army equipped with Soviet weaponry, although some spasmodic discontent with the prevalent economic stringency finds expression during the year. In foreign affairs, the government adheres firmly to the traditional policy of accepting external aid but refusing entangling alliances. Improved terms are secured from the Soviet Union for the sale of Afghanistan's natural gas, but this does not prevent equally friendly relations with China. Pakistan's actions against insurgents in Baluchistan and the North-West Frontier Province are bitterly criticized by the government and press in Kabul. The proscription by Pakistan of the National Awami Party, whose activities in Baluchistan and the North-West Frontier Province were favoured by Afghanistan, further worsens relations between the two countries. Daoud Khan's efforts to mobilize international opinion against Pakistan's action meets with a cool reception, however, they also could choose between parliament or the king.

April
In April 1975, Daoud paid a visit to Iran, and returned with a credit extension of $2 billion. The majority of the sum - $1.7 billion - was expected to be used to fund the construction of a rail system connecting Herat, Kandahar and Kabul to the Iranian rail system, which could provide access to the Persian Gulf. The project was not realized due to oil price collapse and the subsequent ousting of the Iranian Shah.

References

 
Afghanistan
Years of the 20th century in Afghanistan
Afghanistan
1970s in Afghanistan